Tigres Vendéens Etoile Chaumoise 85 Les Sables-d'Olonne is a French association football team founded in 1997. They are based in Les Sables-d'Olonne, Vendée, France and currently play in the Championnat de France Amateurs Group D after being promoted from the CFA 2 in the 2006-2007 season.

1997 establishments in France
Association football clubs established in 1997
Sport in Vendée
Football clubs in Pays de la Loire